Comitas kenneti is an extinct species of sea snail, a marine gastropod mollusc in the family Pseudomelatomidae.

Description

Distribution
This marine species is endemic to New Zealand and fossils were found in Upper Miocene strata of the Wairarapa District.

References

 Beu, A. G. "Bathyal Upper Miocene Mollusca from Wairarapa District, New Zealand." Royal Society of New Zealand, 1970.
 Maxwell, P.A. (2009). Cenozoic Mollusca. pp 232–254 in Gordon, D.P. (ed.) New Zealand inventory of biodiversity. Volume one. Kingdom Animalia: Radiata, Lophotrochozoa, Deuterostomia. Canterbury University Press, Christchurch.

kenneti
Gastropods described in 1970
Gastropods of New Zealand